Conus isabelarum is a species of sea snail, a marine gastropod mollusk in the family Conidae, the cone snails and their allies.

Like all species within the genus Conus, these snails are predatory and venomous. They are capable of "stinging" humans.

Description
The size of the shell varies between 17 mm and 30 mm.

Distribution
This species occurs in the Atlantic Ocean off the island of Maio, Cape Verde.

References
Notes

Bibliography
 Tenorio M.J. & Afonso C.M.L. (2004) Description of four new species of Conus from the Cape Verde Islands (Gastropoda, Conidae). Visaya 1(2): 24–37
 Tucker J.K. (2009). Recent cone species database. September 4, 2009 Edition
 Tucker J.K. & Tenorio M.J. (2009) Systematic classification of Recent and fossil conoidean gastropods. Hackenheim: Conchbooks. 296 pp.
  Puillandre N., Duda T.F., Meyer C., Olivera B.M. & Bouchet P. (2015). One, four or 100 genera? A new classification of the cone snails. Journal of Molluscan Studies. 81: 1–23

External links
 The Conus Biodiversity website
 Cone Shells – Knights of the Sea
 

isabelarum
Gastropods described in 2004
Gastropods of Cape Verde